This article handles air-to-surface special attack units by Action Order only. Therefore, this article does not handle other suicide attack groups using Ko-hyoteki, Kaiten or Shinyo (suicide boat) and other  voluntary special/suicide attack forces.

Air unit names in this article.Japanese military unit names have various translations on en.Wikipedia. This article uses the following side-by-side translations to avoid confusion.

Kamikaze Special Attack Group

1st Kamikaze Special Attack Group

Original unit; 201st NAG (301st FS, 305th FS, 311th FS), 203rd NAG (303rd FS)
21 October 1944
3× A6M2b (attack), 3× A6M (escort); Search and attack U.S. carrier task force east off Philippines.
23 October 1944
?× A6M2b; Search and attack U.S. carrier task force east off Philippines, mission failed and all surviving aircraft returned to base.
25 October 1944
5× A6M2b (attack), 3× A6M (escort); U.S. carrier task force, TA 85°, 30 nmi from Tacloban.

Original unit; 201st NAG (301st FS, 305th FS, 306th FS, 311th FS)
21 October 1944
3× A6M (attack); U.S. carrier task force east off Leyte Gulf.
23 October 1944
2× A6M (attack); Search and attack U.S. carrier task force off Suluan Island.
25 October 1944
2× A6M (attack), 1× D4Y (guidance); U.S. carrier task force, TA 85°-90 nmi from Tacloban.
26 October 1944
5× A6M (attack), 3× A6M (escort); U.S. carrier task force, east of 80 nmi from Surigao.
27 October 1944
2× A6M (attack); U.S. carrier task force, TA 87°-20 nmi from Surigao.

Original unit; 201st NAG (301st FS)
21 October 1944
?× A6M (attack); Search and attack off Philippines, mission failed and aircraft returned to base.
25 October 1944
2× A6M (attack), 1× A6M (escort); U.S. carrier task force, TA 28°-263 nmi from Leyte.

Original unit; 201st NAG (301st FS)
22 October 1944
2× A6M (attack), 2× A6M (escort); Search and attack east off Tacloban, mission failed and aircraft returned to base.
25 October 1944
2× A6M (attack), 2× A6M (escort); U.S. ship east off Mindanao.

Original unit; 201st NAG (301st FS)
25 October 1944
3× A6M (attack), 1× A6M (escort); U.S. carrier task force, east of 40 nmi from Surigao Strait.

Original unit; 201st NAG (306th FS)
25 October 1944
4× A6M (attack), 2× A6M (escort); U.S. carrier task force, east of 90 nmi from Badubg.

Original unit; 201st NAG (301st FS, 305th FS, 306th FS, 311th FS), 252nd NAG (317th FS)
30 October 1944
6× A6M (attack), 5× A6M (escort), U.S. carrier task force, TA 150°-40 nmi from Suluan Island.

Original unit; 201st NAG (311th FS)
29 October 1944
3× A6M (attack); U.S. carrier task force, TA 74°-180 nmi from Manila.

Original unit; 761st NAG (105th AS)
25 October 1944
1× D4Y (attack); Search and attack in Leyte Gulf.

2nd Kamikaze Special Attack Group

Original unit; 701st NAG (5th AS)
27 October 1944
3× D4Y3 (attack); Search and attack in Leyte Gulf.
29 October 1944
1× D4Y3 (attack); U.S. carrier task force, TA 80°-200 nmi from Manila.

Original unit; 701st NAG (5th AS)
27 October 1944
2× D4Y3 (attack); Search and attack in Leyte Gulf.
29 October 1944
1× D4Y3 (attack); U.S. carrier task force, TA 80°-200 nmi from Manila.

Original unit; 701st NAG (102nd AS)
27 October 1944
3× D3A2 (attack); U.S. ship in Leyte Gulf.
28 October 1944
1× D3A2 (attack); U.S. ship in Leyte Gulf

Original unit; 701st NAG (102nd AS)
29 October 1944
1× D3A2 (attack); U.S. carrier task force, TA 80°-200 nmi from Manila.
3× D3A2 (attack); U.S. carrier task force east off Manila.
1 November 1944
1× D3A2 (attack); U.S. ship off Tacloban.

Original unit; 701st NAG (103rd AS)
27 October 1944
3× D3A2 (attack); U.S. ship in Leyte Gulf.

Original unit; 701st NAG (103rd AS)
29 October 1944
3× D3A2 (attack); U.S. carrier task force, TA 80°-200 nmi from Manila.
11 November 1944
1× D3A2 (attack); U.S. convoy, south 20 nmi from Suluan Island.

Original unit; 701st NAG (103rd AS)
29 October 1944
3× D3A2 (attack); U.S. carrier task force, TA 80°-200 nmi from Manila.
1 November 1944
1× D3A2 (attack); U.S. ship off Tacloban.

Original unit; 701st NAG (102nd AS)
1 November 1944
3× D3A2 (attack); U.S. ship off Tacloban.

Original unit; 221st NAG, 653rd NAG (166th FS)
29 October 1944
3× A6M (escort); Escorting Shisei Unit and Jinmu Unit, suicide attack after escorting.
1 November 1944
1× A6M (escort); Escorting Tenpei Unit, suicide attack after escorting.

3rd Kamikaze Special Attack Group

Original unit; 201st NAG (305th FS), 221st NAG (312th FS), 634th NAG (163rd FS)
1 November 1944
1× A6M (attack); U.S. ship in Leyte Gulf.
12 November 1944
3× A6M (attack), 1× A6M5a (escort); U.S. convoy off Tacloban.

Original unit; 203rd NAG (304th FS)
5 November 1944
2× A6M (attack); U.S. carrier task force, TA 90°-140 nmi from Cape Encanto. 

Original unit; 201st NAG
1 November 1944
1× A6M (attack); U.S. convoy in Leyte Gulf.

Original unit; 201st NAG, 203rd NAG (303rd FS)
12 November 1944
4× A6M (attack); U.S. convoy in Leyte Gulf.

Original unit; 221st NAG (407th FS)
5 November 1944
2× A6M (attack); U.S. carrier task force, TA 70°-180 nmi from Cape Encanto.

Original unit; 201st NAG (311th FS), 203rd NAG (308th FS), 221st NAG (316th FS, 407th FS)
12 November 1944
6× A6M (attack), 1× A6M (escort); U.S. convoy in Leyte Gulf.

Original unit; 201st NAG, 221st NAG (312th FS), 341st NAG (402nd FS)
12 November 1944
3× A6M (attack), 1× A6M (escort); U.S. convoy in Leyte Gulf.

Original unit; 201st NAG, 221st NAG (304th FS)
13 November 1944
3× A6M (attack), 1× A6M (escort); U.S. carrier task force, TA 60°-140 nmi from Manila.

Original unit; 221st NAG (308th FS, 313th FS)
14 November 1944
1× A6M (attack), 1× A6M (escort); U.S. carrier task force east off Lamon Bay.

Original unit; 201st NAG (305th FS, 306th FS, 311th FS)
12 November 1944
3× A6M (attack); U.S. convoy in Leyte Gulf.

Original unit; 201st NAG (305th FS, 306th FS)
18 November 1944
3× A6M (attack): U.S. convoy off Tacloban.

Original unit; 201st NAG (303rd FS, 306th FS)
19 November 1944
3× A6M (attack): U.S. convoy off Tacloban.

Original unit; 201st NAG (301st FS, 305th FS), 221st NAG (304th FS)
26 November 1944
2× A6M (attack), 2× A6M (escort); U.S. ship south off Tacloban Channel.

Original unit; 201st NAG (316th FS)
5 December 1944
2× A6M (attack); U.S. convoy, TA 100°-170 nmi from Surigao.

Original unit; 221st NAG (313th FS, 407th FS)
9 November 1944
1× A6M (attack), 1× A6M (escort); Search and attack U.S. carrier task force east off Lamon Bay.

Original unit; 221st NAG (308th FS)
19 November 1944
1× A6M (escort); U.S. carrier task force east off Manila.

Original unit; 201st NAG (302nd FS, 316th FS) 
25 November 1944
2× A6M (attack), 3× A6M (escort); U.S. carrier task force, TA 10°-100 nmi from Cape Naga.

Original unit; 201st NAG (302nd FS), 221st NAG (304th FS, 315th FS)
25 November 1944
2× A6M (attack), 2× A6M (escort); U.S. carrier task force, TA 70°-150 nmi from Clark Field.

Original unit; 201st NAG (302nd FS), 221st NAG (304th FS, 315th FS)
25 November 1944
6× A6M (attack), 2× A6M (escort); U.S. carrier task force, TA 75°-100 nmi from Clark Field.

Original unit; 221st NAG (304th FS)
26 November 1944
2× A6M (attack), 2× A6M (escort); U.S. ship south off Tacloban Channel.

Original unit; 201st NAG (303rd FS, 316th FS), 221st NAG (304th FS), 604th NAG (5th AS), 701st (3rd AS)
27 November 1944
1× A6M, 2× D4Y3 (attack), 3× A6M (escort); U.S. convoy in Leyte Gulf.

Original unit; 201st NAG (302nd FS, 316th FS)
6 December 1944
1× A6M (attack), 1× A6M (escort); U.S. ship in Leyte Gulf.

Original unit; 201st NAG (316th FS), 341st NAG (401st FS)
7 December 1944
4× A6M (attack), 1× N1K1-J (escort); U.S. convoy in Ormoc.

Original unit; 201st NAG (305th FS, 316th FS), 341st NAG (401st FS)
7 December 1944
3× A6M (attack), 3× N1K1-J (escort); U.S. ship in Camotes Sea.

Original unit; 201st NAG (316th FS)
7 December 1944
4× A6M, 1× D4Y (attack); U.S. ship off Camotes Islands.

4th Kamikaze Special Attack Group

Original unit; 701st NAG (102nd AS)
6 November 1944
3× D3A2 (attack); U.S. carrier task force east off Luzon.
7 November 1944
2× D3A2 (attack); Search and attack off Philippines, mission failed and aircraft returned to base.
11 November 1944
1× D3A2 (attack); U.S. convoy, south of 20 nmi from Suluan Island.

Original unit; 701st NAG (103rd AS)
3 November 1944
3× D3A2 (attack); Search and attack off Philippines, mission failed and aircraft returned to base.
11 November 1944
3× D3A2 (attack); U.S. convoy, south of 20 nmi from Suluan Island.

Original unit; 701st NAG (102nd AS)
14 November 1944
3× D4Y3 (attack); Mission was canceled, return to Japan homeland.

Original unit; 701st NAG (3rd AS)
25 November 1944
2× D4Y3 (attack); U.S. carrier task force, TA 75°-150 nmi from Clark Field.

Original unit; 653rd NAG
6 November 1944
1× A6M (escort); Escorting Kashima Unit, suicide attack after escorting.

5th Kamikaze Special Attack Group

Original unit; 763rd NAG
14 November 1944
2× P1Y1 (attack); U.S. carrier task force, east of 210 nmi from Manila, mission failed and aircraft returned to base.

Original unit; 763rd NAG (501st AS), 341st NAG (402nd FS, 701st FS)
25 November 1944
4× P1Y1 (attack), 2× N1K1-J (escort); U.S. carrier task force east off Lamon Bay.

Original unit; 763rd NAG (405th AS)
25 November 1944
2× P1Y1 (attack); U.S. carrier task force east off Lamon Bay.

Original unit; 763rd NAG (405th AS)
4 December 1944
1× P1Y1 (attack); U.S. aircraft carrier in Kossol Roads.

Original unit; 763rd NAG (405th AS)
7 December 1944
5× P1Y1 (attack); U.S. ship west off Leyte.

Original unit; 763rd NAG (405th AS)
15 December 1944
2× P1Y1 (attack); U.S. carrier task force in Sulu Sea.
No name unit
Original unit; 763rd NAG (405th AS)
21 November 1944
3× P1Y1 (attack); U.S. carrier task force, northeast of 230 nmi from Davao.

Kamikaze Special Attack Group "Kongō Unit"

Original unit; 201st NAG (302nd FS)
11 December 1944
4× A6M (attack), 2× A6M (escort); U.S. ship near Surigao Straits.

Original unit; 201st NAG (302nd FS, 316th FS)
13 December 1944
4× A6M (attack), 1× A6M (escort); U.S. ship in Murcielagos Bay.

Original unit; 201st NAG (302nd FS)
14 December 1944
3× A6M (attack), 2× A6M (escort); U.S. convoy, TA 240°-80 nmi from Bacolod.

Original unit; 201st NAG (316th FS)
14 December 1944
2× A6M (attack), 1× A6M (escort); U.S. invasion force off Negros Island.

Original unit; 201st NAG
14 December 1944
6× A6M (attack), 3× D4Y (attack); U.S. convoy south off Dumagueted.

Original unit; 201st NAG (302nd FS, 316th FS)
15 December 1944
6× A6M (attack), 4× A6M (escort); U.S. ship TA 90°, 45 nmi from Nano.

Original unit; 201st NAG (316th FS)
15 December 1944
12× A6M, 1× D4Y (attack); U.S. invasion force off Mindoro.

Original unit; 201st NAG (316th FS)
15 December 1944
2× A6M (attack); U.S. ship in Murcielagos Bay.

Original unit; 201st NAG (316th FS)
16 December 1944
11× A6M, 1× D4Y (attack); U.S. invasion force off San Jose.

Original unit; 201st NAG
16 December 1944
2× A6M (attack), 4× A6M (escort); U.S. carrier task force in northern Sulu Sea, mission failed and aircraft returned to base.

Original unit; 201st NAG
24 December 1944
8× A6M (attack), 8× A6M (escort); U.S. carrier task force TA 78°, 138 nmi from Manila, mission failed and aircraft returned to base.

Original unit; 201st NAG (316th FS)
28 December 1944
3× A6M (attack); U.S. convoy east off Siquijor.

Original unit; 201st NAG (316th FS)
29 December 1944
4× A6M (attack); U.S. convoy south south off Mindoro.

Original unit; 201st NAG
31 December 1944
8× A6M (attack), 6× A6M (escort), 2× D4Y (guidance); U.S. carrier task force TA 88°, 200 nmi from Manila, mission failed and aircraft returned to base.

Original unit; 201st NAG
31 December 1944
4× A6M (attack), 3× A6M (escort), 1× D4Y (guidance); U.S. carrier task force TA 88°, 200 nmi from Manila, mission failed and aircraft returned to base.

Original unit; 201st NAG (302nd FS, 316th FS)
5 January 1945
16× A6M (attack), 4× A6M (escort); U.S. invasion force west off Lubang Island.

Original unit; 201st NAG
6 January 1945
15× A6M (attack), 2× A6M (escort); U.S. invasion force in Lingayen Gulf.

Original unit; 201st NAG (316th FS)
6 January 1945
5× A6M (attack), 1× D4Y (result confirm); U.S. invasion force in Lingayen Gulf.

Original unit; 201st NAG (316th FS)
6 January 1945
4× A6M (attack); U.S. convoy in Lingayen Gulf.

Original unit; 201st NAG (316th FS)
6 January 1945
8× A6M (attack), 4× A6M (escort), 1× D4Y (guidance); U.S. invasion force off Iba.

Original unit; 201st NAG (316th FS)
9 January 1945
1× A6M (attack); U.S. convoy in Lingayen Gulf.

Original unit; 201st NAG (316th FS)
9 January 1945
2× A6M (attack); U.S. ship in Lingayen Gulf.

Original unit; 201st NAG (316th FS), 221st NAG (407th FS)
9 January 1945
2× A6M (attack), 1× A6M (escort); U.S. ship in Lingayen Gulf.

Original unit; 201st NAG
25 January 1945
4× A6M (attack); U.S. ship in Lingayen Gulf.

Original unit; 201st NAG (316th FS)
7 January 1945
3× A6M (attack), 2× A6M (escort); U.S. convoy in Lingayen Gulf.

Original unit; 201st NAG (302nd FS, 316th FS)
7 January 1945
2× A6M (attack), 1× A6M (escort); U.S. convoy in Lingayen Gulf.

Original unit; 201st NAG
3 January 1945
2× A6M (attack); U.S. convoy in Bohol Sea.
6 January 1945
2× A6M (attack); U.S. ship in Lingayen Gulf.
1× A6M (attack); U.S. ship in Leyte Gulf.

Kamikaze Special Attack Group "Niitaka Unit"

Original unit; 221st NAG (317th FS)
15 January 1945
1× A6M (attack); U.S. carrier task force, TA 195°-150 nmi from Magong.

Original unit; 765th NAG (102nd AS)
21 January 1945
5× D4Y3 (attack); U.S. carrier task force, TA 115°-60 nmi from Taitung.

Original unit; 221st NAG (316th FS, 317th FS)
21 January 1945
3× A6M (attack), 1× A6M (escort); U.S. carrier task force east off Taiwan.

Kamikaze Special Attack Group "Taigi Unit"

Original unit; 205th NAG (317th FS)
1 April 1945
3× A6M (attack), 1× A6M (escort); Allies carrier task force south off Miyako-jima.

Original unit; 205th NAG (317th FS)
2 April 1945
1× A6M (attack); ; Allies carrier task force off Okinawa.

Original unit; 205th NAG
3 April 1945
1× A6M (escort); ; Escorting Chūsei Unit, suicide attack after escorting.
2× A6M (escort); ; Escorting Ginga Unit No. 3, suicide attack after escorting.

Original unit; 205th NAG
4 April 1945
1× A6M (attack); ; Allies carrier task force south off Okinawa.

Original unit; 205th NAG
5 April 1945
1× A6M (attack), 1× A6M (escort); Allies carrier task force south off Miyako-jima.

Original unit; 205th NAG
13 April 1945
1× A6M (attack), 1× A6M (escort); Allies carrier task force south off Yonaguni.

Original unit; 205th NAG
14 April 1945
1× A6M (attack), 1× A6M (escort); Allies ship off Okinawa.

Original unit; 205th NAG
17 April 1945
2× A6M (attack); Allies carrier task force east off Taiwan.

Original unit; 205th NAG
28 April 1945
1× A6M (attack); Allies carrier task force south off Miyako-jima.

Original unit; 205th NAG (302nd FS)
28 April 1945
1× A6M (attack); Allies carrier task force south off Miyako-jima.

Original unit; 205th NAG (315th FS, 317th FS)
4 May 1945
6× A6M (attack), 2× A6M (escort); Allies carrier task force south off Miyako-jima.

Original unit; 205th NAG (302nd FS)
9 May 1945
4× A6M (attack), 1× A6M (escort); Allies carrier task force south off Miyako-jima.

Original unit; 205th NAG (302nd FS)
7 June 1945
2× A6M (attack); Allies carrier task force east off Miyako-jima.

Kamikaze Special Attack Group "Tsukuba Unit"

Original unit; Tsukuba NAG
6 April 1945
17× A6M2 (attack); Allies convoy off Okinawa.

Original unit; Tsukuba NAG
14 April 1945
3× A6M2 (attack); Allies carrier task force off Tokunoshima.

Original unit; Tsukuba NAG
16 April 1945
7× A6M2 (attack); Allies carrier task force, southeast of 50 nmi and south of 100 nmi from Tokunoshima.

Original unit; Tsukuba NAG
29 April 1945
5× A6M2 (attack); Allies carrier task force, TA 120°-60 nmi and TA 90°-70 nmi from Okinawa Island.

Original unit; 721st NAG (306th FS)
11 May 1945
9× A6M5 (attack); Search and attack Allies carrier task force off Okinawa.

Original unit; 721st NAG (306th FS)
14 May 1945
14× A6M5 (attack); Search and attack Allies carrier task force east off Tanegashima.

Kamikaze Special Attack Group "Shichisei Unit"

Original unit; Genzan NAG
6 April 1945
12× A6M2 (attack); Allies convoy off Okinawa.

Original unit; Genzan NAG
12 April 1945
17× A6M2 (attack); Allies carrier task force east off Yoronjima.

Original unit; Genzan NAG
16 April 1945
3× A6M2 (attack); Allies ship off Naha.

Original unit; Genzan NAG
16 April 1945
9× A6M2 (attack); Allies carrier task force, southeast of 50 nmi and south of 50 nmi from Kikai Island.

Original unit; Genzan NAG
29 April 1945
4× A6M2 (attack); Allies carrier task force, TA 120°-60 nmi and TA 90°-70 nmi from northern Okinawa Island.

Original unit; 721st NAG (306th FS)
11 May 1945
3× A6M5 (attack); Mission failed and aircraft returned to base.

Original unit; 721st NAG (306th FS)
11 May 1945
1× A6M5 (attack); Search and attack U.S. carrier task force off Okinawa.

Original unit; 721st NAG (306th FS)
14 May 1945
3× A6M5 (attack); Search and attack Allies carrier task force east off Tanegashima.

Kamikaze Special Attack Group "Shinken Unit"

Original unit; Ōmura NAG
6 April 1945
16× A6M2 (attack); Allies convoy off Okinawa.

Original unit; Ōmura NAG
14 April 1945
9× A6M2 (attack); Allies carrier task force off Kerama Islands.

Original unit; Ōmura NAG
16 April 1945
3× A6M2 (attack); Allies ship off Naha.

Original unit; Ōmura NAG
16 April 1945
1× A6M2 (attack); Allies carrier task force, southeast of 55 nmi and south of 50 nmi from Kikai Island.

Original unit; Ōmura NAG
4 May 1945
14× A6M2-K (attack); Allies picket vessels off Okinawa Island.

Original unit; 721st NAG (306th FS)
11 May 1945
4× A6M5 (attack); Allies ship off Okinawa Island.

Kamikaze Special Attack Group "Shōwa Unit"

Original unit; Yatabe NAG
14 April 1945
10× A6M2 (attack); Allies carrier task force east off Tokunoshima.

Original unit; Yatabe NAG
16 April 1945
4× A6M2 (attack); Allies ship off Naha.

Original unit; Yatabe NAG
16 April 1945
4× A6M2 (attack); Allies carrier task force, southeast of 55 nmi and south of 50 nmi from Kikai Island.

Original unit; Yatabe NAG
16 April 1945
2× A6M2 (attack); Allies carrier task force, southeast of 50 nmi and south of 100 nmi from Kikai Island.

Original unit; Yatabe NAG
29 April 1945
7× A6M2-K (attack); Allies carrier task force, TA 120°-60 nmi and TA 90°-70 nmi from northern Okinawa Island.

Original unit; 721st NAG (306th FS)
11 May 1945
2× A6M5 (attack); Allies ship off Okinawa Island.

Original unit; 721st NAG (306th FS)
11 May 1945
6× A6M5 (attack); Search and attack Allies carrier task force off Okinawa Island.

Kamikaze Special Attack Group "Hachiman Unit"

Original unit; Usa NAG
6 April 1945
14× B5N, 15× D3A2 (attack); Allies ship off Okinawa Island.

Original unit; Usa NAG
12 April 1945
10× B5N, 16× D3A2 (attack); Allies ship off Okinawa Island.

Original unit; Usa NAG
16 April 1945
2× B5N, 18× D3A2 (attack); Allies ship off Kadena.

Original unit; Usa NAG
No sorties.

Original unit; Usa NAG
No sorties.

Original unit; Usa NAG
No sorties.

Original unit; Usa NAG
No sorties.

Original unit; Usa NAG
No sorties.

Original unit; Usa NAG
No sorties.

Original unit; Usa NAG
28 April 1945
3× B5N (attack); Allies ship off Naha.

Original unit; Usa NAG
4 May 1945
3× B5N (attack); Allies ship off Okinawa Island.

Kamikaze Special Attack Group "Shirasagi Unit"

Original unit; Himeji NAG
6 April 1945
13× B5N (attack); Allies ship off Okinawa Island.

Original unit; Himeji NAG
12 April 1945
3× B5N (attack); Allies ship off Okinawa Island.

Original unit; Himeji NAG
16 April 1945
2× B5N (attack); Allies ship off Kadena.

Original unit; Himeji NAG
28 April 1945
1× B5N (attack); Allies ship off Naha.

Original unit; Himeji NAG
4 May 1945
1× B5N (attack); Allies ship off Okinawa Island.

Kamikaze Special Attack Group "Seitō Unit"

Original unit; Hyakurihara NAG
6 April 1945
14× D3A2 (attack); Allies convoy off Okinawa Island.

Original unit; Hyakurihara NAG
28 April 1945
6× D3A2 (attack); Allies ship off Okinawa Island.

Original unit; Hyakurihara NAG
25 May 1945
1× D3A2 (attack); Allies ship off Okinawa Island.

Original unit; Hyakurihara NAG
3 June 1945
3× D3A2 (attack); Allies ship off Okinawa Island.

Kamikaze Special Attack Group "Seiki Unit"

Original unit; Hyakurihara NAG
28 April 1945
2× B5N (attack); Allies ship off Naha.

Original unit; Hyakurihara NAG
4 May 1945
1× B5N (attack); Allies ship off Okinawa Island.

Original unit; Hyakurihara NAG
12 May 1945
1× B5N (attack); Allies ship off Okinawa Island.

Kamikaze Special Attack Group "Kusanagi Unit"

Original unit; Nagoya NAG
6 April 1945
13× D3A2 (attack); Allies convoy off Okinawa Island.

Original unit; Nagoya NAG
12 April 1945
2× D3A2 (attack); Allies convoy off Okinawa Island.

Original unit; Nagoya NAG
28 April 1945
13× D3A2 (attack); Allies convoy off Okinawa Island.

Kamikaze Special Attack Group "Mitate Unit"

Original unit; 252nd NAG (317th FS), 752nd NAG (12th RS)
26 November 1944
12× A6M5c (strafe), 2× C6N1 (guidance); B-29's base the Isely Field and Kobler Field in Saipan.

Original unit; 601st NAG (310th FS, 1st AS, 254th AS)
21 February 1945
12× D4Y3, 8× B5N2 (attack), 12× A6M5c (escort); U.S. ship off Iwo Jima.
1 March 1945
1× D4Y3 (attack); U.S. ship off Iwo Jima.

Original unit; 252nd NAG (304th FS, 313th FS, 3rd AS, 5th AS)
3 April 1945
2× D4Y, 2× A6M (attack); Allies carrier task force south off Amami Ōshima.
6 April 1945
1× D4Y, 3× A6M (attack); Allies carrier task force, TA 142°-70 nmi from Amami Ōshima.
3× D4Y (attack), Allies carrier task force, TA 100°-75 nmi from Naha.
7 April 1945
5× A6M (attack); Allies carrier task force, TA 132°-90 nmi from Amami Ōshima.
11 April 1945
3× D4Y, 2× A6M (attack); Allies carrier task force, TA 132°-100 nmi from Amami Ōshima.
17 April 1945
4× D4Y (attack); Allies carrier task force, TA 132°-100 nmi from Amami Ōshima.
22 April 1945
2× D4Y, 2× A6M (attack); Allies carrier task force, TA 145-90 nmi from Amami Ōshima.

Original unit; 601st NAG (308th FS, 310th FS, 1st AS)
3 April 1945
4× D4Y3 (attack); Allies carrier task force, TA 97°-60 nmi from northern Okinawa Island.
6 April 1945
2× D4Y3 (attack); Allies carrier task force, TA 90°-85 nmi from northern Okinawa Island.
7 April 1945
11× D4Y3 (attack); Allies carrier task force, TA 90°-110 nmi from northern Okinawa Island.
11 April 1945
2× A6M (attack); Allies carrier task force, TA 155°-80 nmi from Kikai Island.
15 April 1945
2× A6M (strafing run); Naka Air Field, Okinawa Island.
16 April 1945
2× A6M (attack); Allies carrier task force, TA 140°-60 nmi from Kikai Island.
17 April 1945
4× D4Y3 (attack); Allies carrier task force, TA 155°-80 nmi from Kikai Island.
2× A6M (attack); Allies carrier task force, TA 140°-60 nmi from Kikai Island.
1× A6M (attack); Allies carrier task force, TA 150°-90 nmi from Kikai Island.

Original unit; 706th NAG (405th AS)
7 April 1945
5× P1Y1 (attack); Allies ship off Okinawa Island.

Original unit; 210th NAG
6 April 1945
1× B6N2 (attack); Allies ship off Okinawa Island.

Original unit; 3rd Air Fleet (706th NAG), 5th Air Fleet (762nd NAG)
May 1945
19× P1Y1 (attack), 2× H8K (guidance); No sorties, attack planes were used for the Operation Tan No. 3 at first. However, the Operation Tan No. 3 was canceled.

Original unit; 601st NAG (1st AS)
9 August 1945
6× D4Y (attack); U.S. carrier task force east off Cape Inubō.
1× D4Y (attack); U.S. carrier task force, TA 105°-90 nmi from Kinkasan.
13 August 1945
4× D4Y (attack); U.S. carrier task force east off Cape Inubō.
15 August 1945
11× D4Y (attack); U.S. carrier task force east off Cape Inubō.

Original unit; 706th NAG (405th AS)
No sorties, all planes were use for the Operation Tan No. 4 at first. However, the Operation Tan No. 4 was canceled.

Original unit; 706th NAG (405th AS, 704th AS, 708th AS)

Original unit; 752nd NAG (5th AS)
25 July 1945
12× B7A2 (attack); U.S. carrier task force, TA 135°-200 nmi from Cape Daiō.
9 August 1945
5× B7A2 (attack); U.S. carrier task force, TA 90°-100 nmi from Kinkasan.
13 August 1945
3× B7A2 (attack); U.S. carrier task force, TA 70°-110 nmi from Cape Inubō.
15 August 1945
2× B7A2 (attack); U.S. carrier task force, TA 130°-200 nmi from Katsuura.

Kamikaze Special Attack Group "Ginga Unit"

Original unit; 762nd NAG (501st AS)
27 March 1945
5× P1Y1 (attack); Allies ship off Okinawa.

Original unit; 762nd NAG (501st AS)
2 April 1945
1× P1Y1 (attack); Allies ship southwest off Kyūshū.

Original unit; 762nd NAG (262nd AS)
3 April 1945
3× P1Y1 (attack); Allies ship south off Okinawa.

Original unit; 762nd NAG (262nd AS, 501st AS)
7 April 1945
4× P1Y1 (attack); Allies ship off Ryukyu Islands.

Original unit; 762nd NAG (262nd AS, 501st AS)
11 April 1945
5× P1Y1 (attack); Allies carrier task force south off Kikai Island.

Original unit; 762nd NAG (262nd AS)
16 April 1945
8× P1Y1 (attack); Allies carrier task force south off Kikai Island.

Original unit; 762nd NAG (406th AS)
16 April 1945
4× P1Y1 (attack); Allies carrier task force, TA 155°-50 nmi from Kikai Island.

Original unit; 762nd NAG (406th AS)
17 April 1945
1× P1Y1 (attack); Allies carrier task force off Kikai Island.

Original unit; 762nd NAG (406th AS, 501st AS)
11 May 1945
6× P1Y1 (attack); Allies ship south off Okinawa.

Original unit; 752nd NAG (705th AS), 762nd NAG (406th AS)
25 May 1945
2× P1Y1 (attack); Allies ship off Okinawa.
1× P1Y1 (attack); Allies ship east off Okinawa.

Kamikaze Special Attack Group "Sakigake Unit"

Original unit; Kitaura NAG
4 May 1945
2× E13A, 3× E7K2 (attack); Allies ship off Okinoerabujima.
3× E7K2 (attack); Allies ship off Okinawa.

Original unit; Kashima NAG
4 May 1945
1× E13A, 1× E7K (attack); Allies ship off Okinawa.

Kamikaze Special Attack Group "Kotohira Unit"

Original unit; Takuma NAG
29 April 1945
4×E13A, 16× E7K (attack); Allies ship off Okinawa.
4 May 1945
3× E13A, 12× E7K (attack); Allies ship off Okinawa.
10 May 1945
1× E13A (attack); Allies ship off Okinawa, mission failed and aircraft was return to base.
28 May 1945
1× E13A, 4× E7K (attack); Allies ship off Okinawa.

Original unit; Fukuyama NAG
25 June 1945
5× F1M2 (attack); Allies ship off Okinawa.
27 June 1945
1× F1M2 (attack); Allies ship off Okinawa.
28 June 1945
1× F1M2 (attack); Allies ship off Okinawa.

Kamikaze Special Attack Group "Tokushima-Shiragiku Unit"

Original unit; Tokushima NAG
24 May 1945
11× K11W (attack); Allies ship off Okinawa.

Original unit; Tokushima NAG, Kōchi NAG
27 May 1945
7× K11W (attack); Allies ship off Okinawa.

Original unit; Tokushima NAG, Kōchi NAG
28 May 1945
4× K11W (attack); Allies ship off Okinawa.

Original unit; Tokushima NAG
21 June 1945
3× K11W (attack); Allies ship off Okinawa.

Original unit; Tokushima NAG, Kōchi NAG
25 June 1945
5× K11W (attack); Allies ship off Okinawa.

Kamikaze Special Attack Group "Ryūko Unit"

Original unit; 205th NAG
8× K5Y; No sorties.

Original unit; 205th NAG
8× K5Y; No sorties.

Original unit; 205th NAG
29 July 1945
6× K5Y (attack); U.S. ship in Kerama Islands.

Kamikaze Special Attack Group "Kikusui Corps"

Original unit; 762nd NAG (262nd AS), 801st NAG
11 March 1945
24× P1Y1 (attack), 3× H8K2 (guidance); U.S. aircraft carrier in Ulithi atoll under the Operation Tan No. 2.

Original unit; 762nd NAG (262nd AS, 406th AS, 501st AS)
18 March 1945
9× P1Y1 (attack), 1× P1Y1 (radar); Allies carrier task fore east off Kyūshū.
19 March 1945
5× P1Y1 (attack); Allies carrier task fore east off Kyūshū.
20 March 1945
2× P1Y1 (attack); Allies carrier task fore east off Kyūshū.
21 March 1945
14× P1Y1 (attack); Allies carrier task fore east off Kyūshū.

Original unit; 701st NAG (103rd AS, 105th AS)
18 March 1945
18× D4Y3 (attack), 3× A6M (escort); Allies carrier task fore east off Kyūshū.
19 March 1945
14× D4Y3 (attack); Allies carrier task fore east off Kyūshū.
20 March 1945
7× D4Y3 (attack), 2× A6M (escort); Allies carrier task fore east off Kyūshū.

Original unit; 701st NAG (311th FS, 5th AS, 103rd AS, 105th AS)
27 March 1945
10× D4Y3 (attack); Allies carrier task fore off Okinawa.
29 March 1945
2× D4Y3 (attack); Allies carrier task fore south of 30 nmi from Tanegashima.
16 April 1945
3× D4Y3 (attack); Allies carrier task fore southeast of 50 nmi from Kikai Island.

Original unit; 131st NAG (254th AS, 256th AS), 701st NAG (251st AS)
6 April 1945
10× B6N2 (attack); Allies carrier task fore off Okinawa.

Original unit; 701st NAG (251st AS), 901st NAG
16 April 1945
7× B6N2 (attack); Allies ship off Okinawa.

Original unit; 931st NAG (251st AS)
11 May 1945
10× B6N2 (attack); Allies ship off Okinawa.

Original unit; Kōchi NAG
24 May 1945
8× K11W (attack); Allies ship off Okinawa.
25 May 1945
1× K11W (attack); Allies ship off Okinawa.
27 May 1945
9× K11W (attack); Allies ship off Okinawa.

Original unit; Kōchi NAG
21 June 1945
5× K11W (attack); Allies ship off Okinawa.

Original unit; Kōchi NAG
26 June 1945
1× K11W (attack); Allies ship off Okinawa.

Kamikaze Special Attack Group "Jinrai Corps"

Original unit; 721st NAG (306th FS, 307th FS, 711th AS)
21 March 1945
3× G4M2 (guidance), 15× G4M2E (MXY7 mothership), 15× MXY7 (attack), 32× A6M (escort); U.S. aircraft carrier southeast off 320 nmi from Cape Toi.

Original unit; 721st NAG (708th AS)
1 April 1945
6× G4M2E (MXY7 mothership), 6× MXY7 (attack); Allies carrier task force off Okinawa.

Original unit; 721st NAG (708th AS)
12 April 1945
8× G4M2E (MXY7 mothership), 8× MXY7 (attack); Allies carrier task force off Okinawa.

Original unit; 721st NAG (708th AS)
14 April 1945
7× G4M2E (MXY7 mothership), 7× MXY7 (attack); Allies carrier task force east off Tokunoshima.

Original unit; 721st NAG (708th AS)
16 April 1945
6× G4M2E (MXY7 mothership), 6× MXY7 (attack); Allies ship off Okinawa.

Original unit; 721st NAG
28 April 1945
4× G4M2E (MXY7 mothership), 4× MXY7 (attack); Allies ship off Okinawa.

Original unit; 721st NAG (708th AS, 711th AS)
4 May 1945
7× G4M2E (MXY7 mothership), 7× MXY7 (attack); Allies ship off Okinawa.

Original unit; 721st NAG (708th AS)
11 May 1945
4× G4M2E (MXY7 mothership), 4× MXY7 (attack); Allies ship off Okinawa.

Original unit; 721st NAG (708th AS)
25 May 1945
3× G4M2E (MXY7 mothership), 3× MXY7 (attack); Allies ship off Okinawa.

Original unit; 721st NAG (708th AS)
22 June 1945
6× G4M2E (MXY7 mothership), 6× MXY7 (attack); Allies ship off Okinawa.

Original unit; 721st NAG
2 April 1945
30× A6M5 (attack); Allies ship off Okinawa.

Original unit; 721st NAG
3 April 1945
22× A6M5 (attack); Allies carrier task force south off Amami Ōshima.

Original unit; 721st NAG
6 April 1945
19× A6M5 (attack); Allies carrier task force, TA 190°-76 nmi from Kikai Island.

Original unit; 721st NAG
7 April 1945
12× A6M5 (attack); Allies carrier task force south off Kikai Island.

Original unit; 721st NAG
11 April 1945
13× A6M5 (attack); Allies carrier task force south off Kikai Island.

Original unit; 721st NAG
14 April 1945
6× A6M5 (attack); Allies carrier task force east off Tokunoshima.

Original unit; 721st NAG
16 April 1945
12× A6M5 (attack); Allies carrier task force, southeast of 55 nmi and south of 50 nmi from Kikai Island.

Original unit; 721st NAG
16 April 1945
12× A6M5 (attack); Allies carrier task force, east of 50 nmi and south of 100 nmi from Kikai Island.

Original unit; 721st NAG
29 April 1945
12× A6M5 (attack); Allies carrier task force, TA 120°-60 nmi and TA 90°-70 nmi from northern Okinawa Island.

Original unit; 721st NAG
11 May 1945
4× A6M5 (attack); Search and attack Allies carrier task force off Okinawa.

Original unit; 721st NAG
14 May 1945
5× A6M5 (attack); Search and attack Allies carrier task force east off Tanegashima.

Original unit; 721st NAG (306th FS)
22 June 1945
7× A6M5 (attack); Allies ship off Okinawa.

Original unit; 721st NAG (306th FS)
13 August 1945
2× A6M5 (attack); Allies ship off Okinawa.

Other Kamikazes

Original unit; 153rd NAG (812th FS), 765th NAG (804th FS)
28 December 1944
1× J1N1-S (attack); U.S. convoy in Bohol Sea.
3 January 1945
1× J1N1-S (guidance); Guiding for Kongō Unit No. 30, suicide attack after guiding.

Original unit; 765th NAG (102nd AS)
3 January 1945
1× D4Y (attack); U.S. carrier task force in Bohol Sea.
5 January 1945
1× D4Y (attack); U.S. convoy off Iba.
6 January 1945
1× D4Y (attack); U.S. convoy west of Bohol Sea.
1× D4Y (attack); U.S. aircraft carrier off Lingayen Gulf.
7 January 1945
1× D4Y (attack); U.S. ship in Lingayen Gulf.

Original unit; 761st NAG (252nd AS)
6 January 1945
1× B6N (attack); U.S. ship in Lingayen Gulf.
8 January 1945
1× B6N (attack); U.S. ship in Lingayen Gulf.

Original unit; 221st NAG (317th FS)
21 January 1945
2× A6M (attack); U.S. carrier task force, TA 93°-93 nmi from Taitung.

Original unit; 701st NAG (103rd AS)
24 March 1945
1× D4Y3 (attack); Allies carrier task force off Okinawa.
25 March 1945
1× D4Y3 (attack); Allies ship off Okinawa.

Original unit; 765th NAG (102nd AS, 401st AS)
25 March 1945
3× P1Y1 (attack), 1× D4Y3 (escort); Allies carrier task force south off Okinawa.
6 April 1945
3× P1Y1 (attack); Allies ship off Okinawa.

Original unit; 765th NAG (102nd AS)
1 April 1945
1× D4Y3 (attack); Allies carrier task force south off Ishigaki Island.
3 April 1945
1× D4Y3 (attack); Allies carrier task force south off Okinawa.
6 April 1945
3× D4Y3 (attack); Allies carrier task force south off Ishigaki Island.
16 April 1945
1× D4Y3 (attack); Allies carrier task force south off Ishigaki Island.
28 April 1945
1× D4Y3 (attack); Allies carrier task force east off Miyako-jima.
4 May 1945
1× D4Y3 (attack); Allies carrier task force south off Miyako-jima.
9 May 1945
1× D4Y3 (attack); Allies ship off Kadena.
1× D4Y3, 1× D1A2 (attack); Allies ship off Kerama Islands.
13 May 1945
7× D1A2 (attack); Allies ship off Kerama Islands.
15 May 1945
1× D4Y3 (attack); Allies ship off Kerama Islands.
17 May 1945
1× D1A2 (attack); Allies ship off Kerama Islands.

Original unit; 210th NAG
6 April 1945
12× A6M (attack), 10× N1K1-J (escort); Allies carrier task force south of 80 nmi from Tokunoshima.
11 April 1945
3× A6M (attack); Allies carrier task force east off Okinawa.

Original unit; 210th NAG
6 April 1945
13× D4Y3 (attack); Allies carrier task force, TA 91°-85 nmi from Okinawa Island.
11 April 1945
2× D4Y3 (attack); Allies carrier task force south off Tokunoshima.

Original unit; 951st NAG
12 April 1945
1× D3A (attack); Allies ship west off Okinawa.

Original unit; 763rd NAG (252nd AS)
3 May 1945
1× B6N2 (attack); Allies ship off Okinawa.

Original unit; 12th AG, 331st NAG (253rd AS), 381st NAG, 765th NAG (102nd AS)
3 May 1945
1× B5N, 2× D3A2 (attack); Allies ship off Okinawa Island.
4 May 1945
1× D3A2 (attack); Allies ship off Okinawa.
9 May 1945
3× D3A2 (attack); Allies ship off Okinawa.
13 May 1945
1× B5N (attack); Allies ship off Okinawa.
15 May 1945
2× B5N (attack); Allies ship off Okinawa.
29 May 1945
2× B5N (attack); Allies ship off Okinawa.

Original unit; Hyakurihara NAG
12 April 1945
6× B5N (attack); Allies ship off Okinawa.

Original unit; Hyakurihara NAG
16 April 1945
4× B5N (attack); Allies ship off Kadena.

Original unit; Amakusa NAG
24 May 1945
2× F1M2 (attack); Allies ship off Okinawa.
21 June 1945
5× F1M2 (attack); Allies ship off Okinawa.
25 June 1945
1× F1M2 (attack); Allies ship off Okinawa.
3 July 1945
1× F1M2 (attack); Allies ship off Okinawa.

Original unit; Ōi NAG
K11W; No sorties.

Original unit; 903rd NAG
5× E13A; No sorties, disbanded after the Operation Kikusui No. 1.

Original unit; 752nd NAG (5th AS, 102nd RS)
B7A, C6N1; No sorties.

Original unit; 723rd NAG
C6N1; No sorties.

Original unit; Mineyama NAG
K5Y; No sorties.

Original unit; Yamato NAG
K5Y; No sorties.

Original unit; Okazaki NAG
K5Y; No sorties.

Original unit; 631st NAG, 1st Submarine Flotilla (Submarine I-400, I-401, I-13 and I-14)
10× M6A1;  at first. No sorties.

Original unit; Ōtsu NAG
7× E7K; No sorties.

Original unit; Kashima NAG
F1M2; No sorties.

Other Special Attack Unit

Jinmu Special Attack Group

Original unit; 1st Air Fleet, 1st Carrier Division (Aircraft carrier Unryū and Amagi)
No sorties, all planes were incorporated to each Kamikaze Special Attack Group "Kongō Unit".
No name unit
Original unit; 1st Carrier Division (Aircraft carrier Katsuragi)

Others

Original unit; 762nd NAG (501st AS), Army 7th Flying Regiment
6 January 1945; 5× P1Y1, 6× G4M, 4× Ki-67 I (attack); U.S. carrier task force east off Taiwan.

Original unit; 2nd Fleet (Battleship Yamato and cruiser Yahagi)
3× E13A (attack); Allies ship off Okinawa. No sorties, because the Yamato and the Yahagi had been sunk.

Original unit; Kasumigaura NAG
20× A6M2-K; No sorties.

See also
List of Imperial Japanese Army air-to-surface special attack units

Bibliography
Kazuhiko Osuo, Kōjinsha, Tōkyō, Japan.
Kamikaze, 2005 .
Shinbu, 2005, .
Atene Shobō, Tōkyō, Japan.
Detailed battle report of Combined Fleet, Author: each unit of the Imperial Japanese Navy, reprinted in 1995, .
Vol. 10 Land based air units (1).
Vol. 11 Land Based air units (2).
Vol. 17 Special attack units (1).
Vol. 18 Special attack units (2).
Navy battle record of special attack units, Author: each air unit of the Imperial Japanese Navy, reprinted in 2001, .
Famous Airplanes of the World, Bunrin-Dō Co., Ltd., Tōkyō, Japan.
No. 17 Army Type 3 Fighter "Hien", 1989, .
Special Edition Vol. 1 Navy Bomber "Ginga" [Frances], 2000, .
And other each volume.
Model Art, Model Art Co. Ltd., Tōkyō, Japan.
No. 416, Special issue Medaled Pilots of Japanese Air Force in World War II, 1993.
No. 439, Special issue Heroes of the Imperial Japanese Navy Air Force in 1937–1945, 1994.
No. 451, Special issue Imperial Japanese Army Air Force Suicide Attack Unit, 1995.
No. 458, Special issue Imperial Japanese Navy Air Force Suicide Attack Unit "Kamikaze", 1995.
And other each volume.
Ushio Shobō (Ushioshobokojinsha Co., Ltd.), Tōkyō, Japan.
Monthly The Maru No. 755, 2009.
The Maru Special No. 108, Kamikaze Special Attack Forces, 1986.
The Maru Mechanic No. 1, Shiden Kai", 1976.
And other each volume.
Navy, Seibunsha K.K., Tōkyō, Japan.
Vol. 1, Dawning of the Navy, 1981.
Vol. 5, Pacific War #1, 1981.
Vol. 6, Pacific War #2, 1981.
Vol. 13, Naval Aviation, Naval Air Group and Aircraft, 1981.
Japan Center for Asian Historical Records (http://www.jacar.go.jp/english/index.html), National Archives of Japan, Tokyo, Japan.
Reference code: C08051618300, Tactical operation records from April to May 1945, Flying Squad, Takuma Air Unit.
And other each record.

Kamikaze
Imperial Japanese Navy
Units of the Imperial Japanese Navy Air Service
Japanese World War II special forces
Aerial operations and battles of World War II